Gheorghe Costaforu (October 26, 1820 – November 28, 1876) was a lawyer, university professor and Romanian politician who served as the Minister of Foreign Affairs.

Life and career
A graduate of Law School at Sorbonne University, Costaforu became the author of contemporary education system in Romania. He was one of the initiators of a large university palace complex construction at the University of Bucharest which was started in 1857. In 1864, he was appointed the university's first rector by decree of Alexandru Ioan Cuza, serving until 1871. From March 11, 1871 to April 27, 1873, Costa-Foru served as Minister of Foreign Affairs and in 1873, he was the Romanian envoy to Vienna. He also served as President of the Assembly of Deputies from July 2, 1870
to February 3, 1871.

References

1820 births
1876 deaths
Politicians from Bucharest
Presidents of the Chamber of Deputies (Romania)
Romanian Ministers of Foreign Affairs
Romanian Ministers of Culture
Romanian Ministers of Education
Ambassadors of Romania to Austria-Hungary
Rectors of the University of Bucharest
Academic staff of the University of Bucharest
Romanian university and college faculty deans
University of Paris alumni
Romanian expatriates in France